Pauline Dennert (later Hill; April 8, 1926 – September 17, 2012) was an outfielder who played for the Muskegon Lassies of the All-American Girls Professional Baseball League in 1947. Listed at 5' 4", 145 lb., she batted and threw right handed. Born in Hart, Michigan, she played under her maiden name and was nicknamed Denny.

Pauline appeared in three games for the Lassies and went hitless in four at-bats.

Afterwards, she earned a physical education degree from the Western Michigan University and later worked as the summer recreation director and swim instructor in Hart.

References

1926 births
2012 deaths
All-American Girls Professional Baseball League players
Muskegon Lassies players
Baseball players from Michigan
People from Hart, Michigan
Western Michigan University alumni
21st-century American women